Rockhouse Falls, is a  plunge waterfall that marks Rockhouse Creek's confluence with Cane Creek. The waterfall, which shares a plungepool with Cane Creek Falls, is visible from the Gorge Trail and from the base of the Cane Creek Gorge. The falls are located near Spencer, Tennessee in Fall Creek Falls State Park.

References

Waterfalls of Tennessee
Waterfalls of Van Buren County, Tennessee